Ajekar is a small village at the foot of Valikunja in Karkal taluk of Udupi district, India. It is situated about 15 km from Karkala, 40 km from Udupi and about 65 km north-east of Mangalore.

References 

Villages in Udupi district